Pernal Williams (born 15 August 1991) is a Saint Lucian international footballer who plays for Martiniquais club AS Eclair, as a defender.

Club career
Born in Millet Caico, Martinique, Williams has played for W Connection, Aiglon du Lamentin, La Clary and AS Eclair.

International career
He made his international debut for Saint Lucia in 2010, and has appeared in FIFA World Cup qualifying matches. As of August 2014, Williams had played 19 times for Saint Lucia, scoring once in FIFA recognised competition.

International goals
Scores and results list Saint Lucia's goal tally first.

References

1991 births
Living people
Saint Lucian footballers
Saint Lucia international footballers
W Connection F.C. players
Aiglon du Lamentin players
Association football fullbacks
Saint Lucian expatriate footballers
Saint Lucian expatriate sportspeople in Trinidad and Tobago
Expatriate footballers in Trinidad and Tobago
Saint Lucian expatriate sportspeople in Martinique
Expatriate footballers in Martinique
Saint Lucia youth international footballers